Ozren(Serbian Cyrillic: Озрен) is a mountain in southwestern Serbia, near the town of Sjenica. Its highest peak Orlovača has an elevation of 1,693 meters above sea level. It is one of the mountains which surround the Pešter plateau. Spring of the Uvac river is located at the foothills of Ozren.

References

Mountains of Serbia